Dolenja Vas pri Krškem is a settlement east of Krško in eastern Slovenia. The area is part of the traditional region of Styria. It is now included with the rest of the municipality in the Lower Sava Statistical Region.

The local church is dedicated to Mary Help of Christians and belongs to the Parish of Videm–Krško. It is a Baroque church, built in the early 16th century. Its interior was refurbished in 1878.

References

External links
Dolenja Vas pri Krškem on Geopedia

Populated places in the Municipality of Krško